The German Evangelical Zion Lutheran Church, which became the Tabernacle Baptist Church in 1967, is an historic Lutheran church that is located at Capital and Herr Streets in Harrisburg, Pennsylvania. 

It was added to the National Register of Historic Places in 1975.

History and architectural features
Built in 1886, this historic church is a two-story brick building, which was designed in a modified Gothic style. It features a three-story square bell tower with large oval windows and brick tracery. 

Attached to the church by a one-bay, two-story section is a three-story brick parsonage that was built in 1897.

It was added to the National Register of Historic Places in 1975.

In November 2019, the Tabernacle Baptist parish left the church building and moved to another location.  The site was briefly known as Choice Community Christian Church until March 2021 when the CCCC parish also moved to another location.

References

External links
Official Website

Churches on the National Register of Historic Places in Pennsylvania
Gothic Revival church buildings in Pennsylvania
Churches completed in 1886
19th-century Lutheran churches in the United States
Churches in Harrisburg, Pennsylvania
Churches in Dauphin County, Pennsylvania
German-American culture in Pennsylvania
National Register of Historic Places in Harrisburg, Pennsylvania